Lefteris Intzoglou (born 3 March 1987) is a Greek professional footballer who plays as a defensive midfielder.

Career
Intzoglou began playing professional football by signing with Vyzas in June 2005. He requested a transfer in June 2009, but did not leave the club until the end of the 2009–10 season. AEK Athens manager Dušan Bajević signed Intzoglou in June 2010. In July 2011 he signed for Atromitos and he was immediately loaned out to Pierikos. He debuted for Pierikos in a match against his former club Vyzas. He scored his sole goal for the club to help his team get a draw against Kalloni. In the summer of 2012 he reached an agreement with Doxa Drama with which he spent the 2012-13 season. On 2 August 2013 Intzoglou signed a contract with Greek Football League outfit Iraklis. He made his debut for his new club in an away 3–2 loss against Kavala. He scored his first goal for Iraklis in 1–2 home defeat versus Niki Volos. On 18 July 2017, Intzoglou signed a two years' contract with rivals Aris for an undisclosed fee.

Personal life
He is the son of former Greek international football player Babis Intzoglou and nephew of Thanasis Intzoglou.

References

External links
 Myplayer.gr profile

Living people
1987 births
Association football forwards
Vyzas F.C. players
AEK Athens F.C. players
Atromitos F.C. players
Doxa Drama F.C. players
Iraklis Thessaloniki F.C. players
Pierikos F.C. players
Aris Thessaloniki F.C. players
Super League Greece players
Footballers from Piraeus
Greek footballers